The Group of 15 (G-15) is an informal forum set up to foster cooperation and provide input for other international groups, such as the World Trade Organization (WTO) and the Group of Seven.  It was established at the Ninth Non-Aligned Movement Summit Meeting in Belgrade, Yugoslavia, in September 1989, and is composed of countries from Latin America, Africa, and Asia with a common goal of enhanced growth and prosperity. The G-15 focuses on cooperation among developing countries in the areas of investment, trade, and technology. Membership has since expanded to 18 countries, but the name has remained unchanged. Chile, Iran and Kenya have since joined the Group of 15, whereas Yugoslavia is no longer part of the group; Peru, a founding member-state, decided to leave the G-15 in 2011.

Structure and activities
Some of the objectives of the G-15 are:

 To harness the considerable potential for greater and mutually beneficial cooperation among developing countries
 To conduct a regular review of the impact of the world situation and of the state of international economic relations on developing countries
 To serve as a forum for regular consultations among developing countries with a view to coordinate policies and actions
 To identify and implement new and concrete schemes for South-South cooperation and mobilize wider support for them
 To pursue a more positive and productive North-South dialogue and to find new ways of dealing with problems in a cooperative, constructive and mutually supportive manner.

By design, the G-15 has avoided establishing an administrative structure like those for international organizations, such as the United Nations or the World Bank; but the G-15 does have a Technical Support Facility (TSF) located in Geneva. The TSF functions under the direction of the Chairman for the current year.  The TSF provides necessary support for the activities of the G-15 and for its objectives.  Other organs and functions of the G-15 include:

 Summit of heads of state and government: The G-15's summit is organized biennially, with the venue being rotated among the three developing regions of the G-15 membership.
 Annual meetings of Ministers of Foreign Affairs: G-15 Ministers of Foreign Affairs typically meet once a year to coordinate group activities and to prepare for the nest summit of G-15 leaders.
 Steering committee (Troika): A steering committee, or Troika, is composed of three foreign ministers, one from the preceding summit host country, the present host country and the anticipated next host countries.  These three are responsible for oversight and coordination.
 Personal representatives of heads of state and government: Each member country is represented by personal representatives of heads of state and government who meet regularly in Geneva.

In addition, the Federation of Chambers of Commerce, Industry and Services (FCCIS) is a private sector forum of G-15 member countries.  The purpose of the FCCIS is to coordinate and maximize efforts which promote business, economic development and joint investment in G-15 nations.

In 2010, the chairmanship of the G-15 was accepted by Sri Lanka at the conclusion of the 14th G-15 summit in Tehran.

Members countries and organizations
World Economic Outlook database (2012)

G-15 Summits

See also
 Global System of Trade Preferences among Developing Countries (GSTP)

References

Further reading
 Haas, P.M. (1992). "Introduction. Epistemic communities and international policy coordination", International Organization 46,1:1-35. , E-
 Bob Reinalda and Bertjan Verbeek. (1998).  Autonomous Policy Making by International Organizations London: Routledge. ; ;

External links

G-15 official website
IMF

 
Intergovernmental organizations
Non-Aligned Movement
20th-century diplomatic conferences
21st-century diplomatic conferences (Global)
Economic country classifications